Las lanzas coloradas is a 1931 Venezuelan novel by Arturo Uslar Pietri.

Venezuelan novels
1931 novels
Novels set in Venezuela